Turnovo is a village in the municipality of Bosilovo, North Macedonia.

Demographics
According to the 2002 census, the village had a total of 941 inhabitants. Ethnic groups in the village include:

Macedonians 941

Sports
Local football club FK Horizont have finished runners-up in the 2013–14 Macedonian First Football League and qualified for the UEFA Europa League twice. They play their home games in neighboring  Strumica however.

See also
 Bosilovo Municipality
 Strumica
 Bosilovo

References

Villages in Bosilovo Municipality